Lloyd Titus was an American architect who designed at least 10 school buildings that are listed on the U.S. National Register of Historic Places (NRHP).

His NRHP-listed works in Philadelphia include:
Richardson L. Wright School, 1101 Venango St., Philadelphia, Pennsylvania, designed by Lloyd Titus, the Chief Draftsman, from 1901 to 1905, of the Department of Buildings of the Philadelphia School Board.
South Philadelphia High School. The original building was constructed 1907 in a Norman Romanesque style designed by Board of Education Architect Lloyd Titus.
William W. Axe School, 1709–1733 Kinsey St.
Alexander Dallas Bache School, 801 N. Twenty-second St.
George L. Brooks School, 5629–5643 Haverford Ave.
Thomas Dunlap School, 5031 Race St.
George L. Horn School, Frankford and Castor Aves.
Thomas Meehan School, 5347–5353 Pulaski St.
Northeast Manual Training School, 701 Lehigh St.
Overbrook Elementary School, 2032 N. 62nd St.
William J. Stokely School, 1844–1860 N. Thirty-second St.

References

External links

American architects